Bälinge Church is a medieval church in Bälinge, Uppsala Municipality, Sweden. It is part of the Archdiocese of Uppsala (Church of Sweden).

History and architecture
The church was built at the end of the 13th century and has been substantially altered on several occasions. It derives much of its present appearance from changes made during the 18th century and during a large reconstruction carried out in 1874-88.

The church interior contains two sets of murals, one dating from the early 15th century and another made later in the same century by the workshop of Albertus Pictor or an artist influenced by him. The church also contains two notable medieval altarpieces, one of which may originally have been placed in Uppsala Cathedral as a side altar.

References

External links

Churches in Uppsala County
Church frescos in Sweden
Churches converted from the Roman Catholic Church to the Church of Sweden
Churches in the Diocese of Uppsala